The Douglas XT-30 was a proposed American military advanced trainer. It was never built.

Design and development

Intended to replace the North American T-6 Texan, the XT-30 was designed in 1948 for a United States Air Force competition. The design had an  Wright R-1300 radial mounted amidships behind the cockpit (in the fashion of the P-39), in a rather squared-off fuselage. The R-1300 drove a three-bladed propeller by way of an extension shaft (driveshaft). The XT-30 design seated pilot and pupil in tandem, under a framed greenhouse canopy and had a straight low wing.

Competing against the North American T-28 Trojan, the more complex XT-30 was not selected for production and none were built.

Specifications (projected)

See also
 North American T-28 Trojan

References

Notes

Bibliography

 Francillon, René J. McDonnell Douglas aircraft since 1920.  London : Putnam, 1979.

Cancelled military aircraft projects of the United States
T-030
Mid-engined aircraft